Hirni Falls is a waterfall located in West Singhbhum in the Indian state of Jharkhand.

Falls
At an edge of the Ranchi plateau, around Bandgaon, the Ramgarha River plunges down  in a broad torrent as the Hirni Falls. Situated in a dense forest area, Hirni has been favoured by nature for scenic beauties.

Transport

See also
List of waterfalls in India
List of waterfalls in India by height

References

Waterfalls of Jharkhand
Waterfalls of India